IMAG History & Science Center (formerly Imaginarium Science Center) is a hands-on science and aquarium museum in Fort Myers, Florida. Exhibit include dinosaurs and fossils, Calusa culture, live native and non-native small animals, aquariums and touch tanks, and interactive displays about science and scientific topics including weather and nanotechnology. The museum offers a summer camp.

See also
List of museums in Florida

References

External links
Imaginarium Science Center website

Museums in Lee County, Florida
Buildings and structures in Fort Myers, Florida
Science museums in Florida
Natural history museums in Florida
Tourist attractions in Fort Myers, Florida